Jorge López Montaña (born 19 September 1978) is a Spanish former professional footballer who played as a right midfielder.

Over 11 seasons, he amassed La Liga totals of 271 matches and 36 goals, representing Villarreal, Valencia, Mallorca, Racing de Santander and Zaragoza in the competition and winning major titles with the second club, including the 2004 national championship.

Club career
López was born in Logroño, La Rioja. A product of hometown CD Logroñés' youth system he was purchased by Villarreal CF in the summer of 1999, with whom he achieved La Liga promotion at the end of the season. Making his top-flight debut on 10 September 2000 in a 1–5 home loss against Rayo Vallecano, he finished the campaign missing only three league matches and scoring eight goals, with the Valencians finishing seventh.

Joining neighbours Valencia CF for 2003–04 in a €4 million deal, López played 26 matches and netted four times as they were proclaimed national champions. After a loan to fellow league side RCD Mallorca, he would only total 19 league appearances the next two seasons, mainly due to injuries.

López was released by Valencia in 2007, and was signed by Racing de Santander on a free transfer, where he was a key element in the team's first-ever qualification for the UEFA Cup after a sixth-place finish. On 25 November 2007, he scored the game's only goal in a home victory over his previous club.

Having already played one game in the 2008–09 season with Racing, a 1–1 home draw to Sevilla FC, López was sold to Segunda División's Real Zaragoza on 1 September 2008, for €3 million. He scored seven goals in 38 matches as his new team immediately returned to the top tier, surpassing the 3,000-minute mark, but featured significantly less the following campaign although he began it in the starting XI.

López left Zaragoza in July 2011, after failing to negotiate a new contract. He had his first experience abroad at the age of 33, joining OFI Crete F.C. in Greece.

In January 2013 López, who had become a free player due to financial problems in his previous club, moved to Belgium and joined several compatriots (including manager Víctor Fernández) at K.A.A. Gent. After a brief spell in his country's Segunda División B with Cádiz CF, he retired at the age of 36.

Personal life
López's younger brother, Iñigo, was also a footballer.

Honours
Villarreal
UEFA Intertoto Cup: 2003

Valencia
La Liga: 2003–04

References

External links

1978 births
Living people
Sportspeople from Logroño
Spanish footballers
Footballers from La Rioja (Spain)
Association football midfielders
La Liga players
Segunda División players
Segunda División B players
CD Logroñés footballers
Las Rozas CF players
Villarreal CF players
Valencia CF players
RCD Mallorca players
Racing de Santander players
Real Zaragoza players
Cádiz CF players
Super League Greece players
OFI Crete F.C. players
Belgian Pro League players
K.A.A. Gent players
Spanish expatriate footballers
Expatriate footballers in Greece
Expatriate footballers in Belgium
Spanish expatriate sportspeople in Greece
Spanish expatriate sportspeople in Belgium
Spanish expatriate sportspeople in Ukraine